Hazi Salim Uddin Barbhuiya is an Indian politician. In 2006 he was elected as MLA of Hailakandi Vidhan Sabha Constituency in Assam Legislative Assembly. He is an All India United Democratic Front politician.

References

Year of birth missing (living people)
All India United Democratic Front politicians
Living people
People from Hailakandi district
21st-century Bengalis